The 2023 Davidson Wildcats baseball team will represent Davidson College during the 2023 NCAA Division I baseball season. The Wildcats played their home games at T. Henry Wilson Jr. Field as a member of the Atlantic 10 Conference. They will be led by head coach Rucker Taylor, in his fifth season with the program.

Previous season

The 2022 Davidson Wildcats baseball team notched a 42–11 (20–4) regular season record, winning the Atlantic 10 regular season championship, and earning the top overall seed and hosting rights in the 2022 Atlantic 10 Conference baseball tournament. Davidson opened their tournament series with a victory over George Mason, before losing two consecutive games to VCU and Richmond to eliminate them in the tournament. Despite their 40-plus win season, Davidson did not earn an at-large berth into the 2022 NCAA Division I baseball tournament.

At the end of the season, assistant coach Ryan Munger left Davidson to join former VCU head coach, Shawn Stiffler, to be an assistant coach for the University of Notre Dame. Pitching coach, Parker Bangs, left Davidson in the offseason to become the new pitching coach for Rice University.

In September 2022, Davidson hired Todd Miller from Tennessee Tech as an assistant coach.

Preseason

Preseason Atlantic 10 awards and honors
Michael Carico was named the Atlantic 10 Preseason Player of the Year and Ryan Feczko was named the Preseason Pitcher of the Year. Carico, Feczko, Ryan Wilson, and Bennett Flynn were named to the All-Atlantic 10 Preseason team.

Coaches poll 
The Atlantic 10 baseball coaches' poll was released on February 7, 2023. Davidson was picked to win the Atlantic 10.

Preseason All-Americans

Sources:

Personnel

Starters

Roster

Coaching Staff

Source

Game log

Statistics

Team batting

Team pitching

Rankings

References

External links 
 Davidson College Baseball

Davidson
Davidson Wildcats baseball seasons
Davidson Wildcats baseball